Odorrana andersonii (common names: golden cross band frog, Yunnan odorous frog, Anderson's frog) is a species of frog in the family Ranidae that is found in northeastern India, Upper Myanmar, southwestern China (Yunnan, Guizhou and Guangxi), northern Thailand, Laos, and Vietnam; records from Laos and Vietnam may refer to another species. They are found in low tree branches and on rocks along shaded rocky streams and large rivers with boulders, in evergreen forests and agricultural areas. Breeds takes place in streams.

Odorrana andersonii is considered as being of "Least Concern" by the International Union for Conservation of Nature (IUCN), although over-exploitation for food and habitat change are threats to this species.

References

andersonii
Amphibians described in 1882
Amphibians of Myanmar
Amphibians of China
Frogs of India
Amphibians of Laos
Amphibians of Thailand
Amphibians of Vietnam
Taxonomy articles created by Polbot